Sir Harry Greer (18 September 1876 – 20 March 1947) was a British businessman and Conservative politician.

He was elected Member of Parliament for Clapham in a by-election in 1918. However, in the general election of that year he contested, and won, the constituency of Wells. He held the seat until the next election in 1922. He was knighted in the 1922 New Years Honours List.

He later became chairman of the Lord Roberts Memorial Workshops, an organisation set up to create employment for wounded ex-servicemen and named after Field Marshal Lord Roberts. In the 1930s, he joined the board of the Baird Television company, and soon became its chairman. In 1934 his speech to shareholders was delivered by television from Crystal Palace to a meeting in Film House, Wardour Street, London, seven miles away. Until his death he was chairman of the Scottish Machine Tool Corporation.

He married in 1906 and had three daughters.

References 

 
 Obituary, The Times, 21 March 1947

External links 
 
 

1876 births
1947 deaths
Conservative Party (UK) MPs for English constituencies
UK MPs 1910–1918
UK MPs 1918–1922
Knights Bachelor